When a Snail Falls in Love is a 2016 Chinese television series directed by Zhang Kai-zhou and produced by Daylight Entertainment. It stars Wang Kai, Wang Ziwen, Xu Yue, and Yu Heng. It is based on Ding Mo's novel of the same title, who also wrote Love Me If You Dare starring Wallace Huo.  The series aired on Dragon TV from 24 October to 12 December 2016.

The series saw 200 million online hits the first week, and on 15 November the production team announced that the show had reached 1 billion views online. The show is also popular with international viewers, with a 9.4 out 10 score on Viki, and has been praised for its suspenseful storyline and tightly woven plot.

Synopsis
Ji Bai is a stone-faced team leader of the Violent Crime Unit. Xu Xu is a new intern specializing in offender profiling. Tasked with solving a series of crimes that are somehow mysteriously connected, the two develop feelings for each other. Xu Xu draws comic panels of their relationship, portraying herself as a snail and Ji as a lion.

Cast

 Wang Kai as Ji Bai (季白) - Detective of at Ling Police Department
 Wang Ziwen as Xu Xu (许诩) - Profiling intern at Ling Municipal Police
 Xu Yue (徐悦) as Yao Meng (姚檬) - Police intern at Ling Police Department
 Yu Heng (于恒) as Zhao Han (赵寒) - Police Officer at Ling Police Department
 Zhao Yuanyuan (赵圆瑗) as Ye Zixi (叶梓夕) - Member of the Ye family and Ji Bai's childhood friend
 Wu Xiaoyu (武笑羽) as Ye Qiao (叶俏) - Heiress of the Ye Corporation.
 Zhang Yanyan (张棪琰) as Brother Lu (噜哥) - Head of a drug cartel

Soundtrack

Ratings 

 Highest ratings are marked in red, lowest ratings are marked in blue

Awards and nominations

International broadcast

References

External links
 
 When a Snail Falls in Love on Tencent
 When a Snail Falls in Love on YouTube
 When a Snail Falls in Love on Viki

Chinese crime television series
2016 Chinese television series debuts
Television shows based on works by Ding Mo
Dragon Television original programming
Television series by Daylight Entertainment
Television series by Tencent Penguin Pictures